This is a list of English words inherited and derived directly from the Old English stage of the language. This list also includes neologisms formed from Old English roots and/or particles in later forms of English, and words borrowed into other languages (e.g. French, Anglo-French, etc.) then borrowed back into English (e.g. bateau, chiffon, gourmet, nordic, etc.). Foreign words borrowed into Old English from Old Norse, Latin, and Greek are excluded, as are words borrowed into English from Ancient British languages.

A

a
a-
A-1
A-frame
A-line
a.k.a.
a.s.a.p.
aback
abaft
abeam
abear 
abed
abide
abiding
ablaze
able-bodied
aboard
abode
about
above
aboveboard
abovementioned
abraid
abreast
abroad
absentminded
abuzz
accursed
ach
ache
ack
acknowledge
acknowledgement
acorn
acre
addeem
adder
addle
ado
adrift
adware
adwesch
adze
afar
afeared
afford
affright
afield
afire
afloat
afoot
afore
aforesaid
aforethought
afoul
afresh
aft
after
afterglow
afterlife
aftermath
afterthought
afterward
afterwards
afterword
again
against
aghast
aglow
ago
aground
ah
aha
ahead
ahem
ail
ailment
ain't
air freshener
air raid
airborne
aircraft
airedale
airhead
airline
airtight
ait
ajar
akimbo
akin
alack
albeit
alder
alderman
ale
alehouse
alewife
Alfred
alight (v)
alight (adj)
alike
alit
alive
all
allspice
allay
allright (all right)
almighty
almost
almshouse
alone
along
alongside
aloud
already
alright
also
although
altogether
always
am
amain
amaze
amazement
amazing
amid
amidst
amiss
among
amongst
an
and
anent
anew
angle (v)
angler
Angle
Anglian
Anglican
Anglicize
Anglo
Anglo-Saxon
Anglophile
Anglophone
ankle
anklet
anneal
anon
another
answer
anthill
antsy
anvil
any
anybody
anyhow
anyone
anything
anyway
anyways
anywhere
anywise
ape
apple
aquiver
archfiend
are
aren't
aright
arise
arisen
arising
arm (anatomical)
armpit
arms-length
arm "poor, pitiful"
arrow
arse
arsehole
arseling
art (v)
artwork
as
asap
Ascot
asea
ash
ash (Bot.)
ashen
ashamed
Ashley
ashore
ashtray
aside
ask
asleep
aspen
astern
astir
astride
asunder
at
at all
at bay
ate
athel
atheling
atop
attaboy
attercop
atwitter
Audrey
auger
aught (something)
aught (zero)
auld
autoharp
automaker
aw
awake (v)
awoke
awoken
awake (adj)
awaken
aware
awareness
awash
away
awe
awhile
awl
awry
ax
axe
axle
ay
aye (yes)

B

babble
babe
baby
baby boom
babysit
babysitter
back (n)
back (v)
back (adj)
back down
back off
back up
back-talk
backbencher
backbiting
backbone
backdoor
backdrop
backfill
backfire
backgammon
background
backhand
backing
backlash
backside
backslide
backstab
backstabber
backstop
backup
backward
backwards
backwash
backwater
backyard
bad
badder
baddest
bad-mouth
badass
bade
badge
badger (n)
badger (v)
baff
baffle
baffling
bairn
bake
baker
bakery
bald
bale
baleful
balk
ball
ballast
ballocks
ballpark
ballroom
balls
ballsy
bally
bam
ban (v)
ban (n)
band (ties)
bandwidth
bane
bank (mass, heap)
bann
banns
bare
barefoot
barely
bark (v)
barley
barm
barmy
barn
barroom
barrow (wheelbarrow)
barrow (mound)
baseball
baseline
bass (fish)
bast
batch
bateau
bated breath
bath
bathe
bathing
bathroom
bathtub
batman
battle-axe
battlefield
battleship
baulk
be
be-
beach
beachhead
beacon
bead
beadle
beady
beam
bean
bean bag
beanery
beanie
beano
bear (v)
bearable
bear (n)
beard
bearing
bearings
bearish
beat
beaten
beater
beating
beat up
beatnik
beaver
beck
beckon
becloud
become
became
becoming
bed
bedbug
bedding
bedeen
bedizen
bedridden
bedrock
bedroom
bedspread
bedstead
bedtime
bee
bee's knees
beech
beefeater
beehive
beek
beeline
been
beer
beeswax
beetle (n)
beetle (v)
befall
befang
befit
befitting
before
beforehand
befoul
befriend
befuddle
beg
beggar
beget
begat
begotten
begin
began
beginner
beginning
begun
begone
begorra
begripe
behalf
behave
behavior, behaviour
behavioral, behavioural
behaviorism
behead
behelm
behest
behind
behold
beheld
beholden
behoof
behoove, behove
being (n)
belated
belay
belch
belead
beleave
belie
belief
believe
believable
believer
belittle
belive "to remain"
bell
bell bottoms
bellboy
bellhop
bellow
bellowing
bellows
bellwether
belly (n)
belly (v)
belly button
belly dance
bellyache
bellyful
belong
belongings
beloved
beltway
bemoan
bench
bench-warmer
benchmark
bend
bender
beneath
benight
bent
bent (bent-grass)
benumb
Beowulf
bequeath
bequest
bereave
bereft
bereavement
Berkshire
berry
berth
beseech
besought
beseeching
beset
beshield
beshrew
beside
besides
besom
bespeak
bespoke
bespoken
bespeckled
bespoke (made to order)
best
bestest
bestir
bestow
bestowal
bestride
bet
betide
betimes
betoken
betroth
betrothed
better
between
betwixt
beware
bewilder
bewildered
bewitch
beyond
bid
bidden
bide
bier
Big Apple
Big Brother
Big Dipper
bight
bigot
bigotry
bill (beak)
billboard
billfold
billingsgate
bimonthly
bind
binder
binding
bindle
bine
binge
bingo
biofeedback
bippy
birch
bird
bird (young lady)
birdie
Birmingham
birthday
birthday suit
birthright
bishopric
bit
bitch
bitchy
bite
bit
bitten
bitter
bitterness
bittersweet
bitsy
bitty
biweekly
blab
blabber
blabbermouth
black
black box
black code
Black Death
black dwarf
Black English
black eye
Black Hand
black hole
black market
Black Panther
black sheep
Black Shirt
blackball
blackberry
blackbird
blackboard
blackguard
blackjack
blacklist
blackmail
blackout
blacksmith
bladder
blade
blain
blanch (turn aside)
blare
blaring
blast
blasted
blatant
blaze (fire)
blazer (jacket)
blazing
bleach
bleacher
blear
bleat
blee "colour"
bleed
bleeding (n)
blench
blend
bless
blessed, blest
blessing
blew
blight
blighter
blimey
blind
blind date
blind spot
blinded
blindfold
blindness
blinds
blindside
blink
blinkered
blinkers
bliss
blissful
blithe
blithesome
blizzard
blob
blockbuster
blockhead
blood
blood pressure
blood type
bloodcurdling
bloodletting
bloodlust
bloodshed
bloodshot
bloodstream
bloodsucker
bloodthirsty
bloody
Bloomsbury
blossom
blow (move air)
blow (bloom)
blow (hard hit)
blow job
blow out
blow up
blowfish
blowhard
blowhole
blown
blubber
blubbering
blue blood
blue chip
blue moon
blueberry
bluebird
bluegrass
bluestocking
blur
blurry
blurt
blush
bo tree
boar
board (plank)
board (side of a ship)
boarder
boardroom
boardwalk
boat
boatswain
bob (v)
bobble
bobcat
bod
bodacious
bode
bodice
bodily
bodkin
body
bodyguard
bogeyman
boil (cyst, tumor)
bold
boll
bollix
bollock
bollocks
Bollywood
bolster
bolt
bombshell
bond
bondage
bondman
bondsman
bone (n)
bone (v)
bonehead
boner
bonfire
book
bookcase
bookie
bookish
bookkeeper
booklet
bookmark
bookstaff
bookstave
bookstore
bookworm
boom (v)
boot (profit, use)
bootless
bore
bored
boring
boredom
born
borne
borough
borrow
bosom
Boston
Boston tea party
bottleneck
bottom
bottom line
bough
bought
boughten
bound (tied, fastened)
bourn (small stream)
bout
bow (v)
bow (n)
bower
bowie knife
bowl
bowler (hat)
bowtie
box (strike blows)
boxer
boxing
boy
boyfriend
boyish
boysenberry
braid
brain
brain child
brainiac
brainstorm
brainwashing
brainy
bramble
brand
brand new
brash
brass
brassy
braze (to cover with brass)
brazen
brb
breach
bread
bread-basket
breadth
breadwinner
break
break dancing
breakage
breakdown
breaker (wave)
breakeven
breakfast
breakneck
breakout
breakthrough
breakup
breakwater
breast
breastbone
breastwork
breath
breathalyzer
breathe
breather
breathless
breathtaking
breech
breeches
breed
breeder
brew
brewery
briar
bridal
bride
bridegroom
bridesmaid
bridewell
bridge
bridle
brier
bright
brighten
brightness
brim
brimful
brimming
brimstone
brinded
brindle
brindled
brine
bring
brinkmanship
briny
bristle
bristly
Bristol
britches
brite
British
brittle
bro
broad
broad-minded
broadband
broadcast
broaden
broadside
broadsword
Broadway
broke
brood
brooding
broody
brook (small stream)
brook (tolerate, endure)
broom
broth
brothel
brother
brother in law
brotherhood
brought
brow
browbeat
brown
Brown Shirt
brown-nose
brownfield
brownie
bruise
brunch
brung
BS
btw
bub
bubba
bubble
bubbly
buck
buck-eye
buckboard
bucket
Buckinghamshire
bucko
buckshot
buckskin
bucktooth
bud
buddy
bug
bugbear
build
builder
buildup
bulkhead
bull
bulldoze
bulldozer
bulletin board
bullfinch
bullheaded
bullish
bullock
bullpen
bullseye
bullshit
bulrush
bum (buttocks, bottom)
bumble
bumblebee
bumf
bunch
bunghole
Bunsen burner
bunt
burd
burden
burdensome
burial
Burke
burly
burn
burnout
burrow
burst
burthen
bury
busboy
bush
bushy
business
businessman
bust (burst)
bustle
busy
busybody
busyness
but
butt (end)
butterfly
buttermilk
butternut
butthead
butthole
buttock
buttocks
buttonhole
buxom
buy
buy-in
buyer
buyout
buzz
buzz saw
buzzer
buzzword
by
bye (sporting)
bye (good-bye)
bygone
bygones
bylaw
byline
byre
bystander
byspel
byword

C

c/o
cade
cadge
cadger
cakewalk
calf
call
call girl
caller
callow
calve
Cambridge
cammock
campfire
can (v)
can (n)
can't
candlelight
canebreak
cannery
cannot
canny
Canterbury
care
care package
carefree
careful
carefully
caregiver
careless
carelessness
caretaker
careworn
caring
cartwheel
carve
cast iron
castaway
cat
catbird
catcall
catchall
catchword
caterwaul
cattail
catwalk
ceasefire
centerfold
cesspool
chafer
chaff
chaffer
chaffinch
chain gang
chairman
chalkboard
champ (v)
chap (v)
chapbook
char (chore)
char (burn)
charcoal
chare
Charles's Wain
Charleston
charley horse
charlock
charwoman
chary
chat
chat room
chatter
chatterbox
chatty
chaw
checkout
checkup
cheddar
cheek
cheeky
cheep
cheerleader
Chelsea
Cheshire
Cheshire cat
Chesterfield
chestnut
chew
chick
chicken
chicken lobster
chicken pox
chide
chifferobe
chiffon
chifforobe
chiffrobe
chilblain
child
children
child abuse
childbearing
childcare
childe
childhood
childish
childlike
chill
chilly
chime (rim of a barrel)
chin
chink (slit)
chip
chippy
chirp
chirpy
chitchat
chock-full
chode
choke
chomp
choose
choosy
chop (cut)
chopper
chops
chopstick
chore
chose
chuckle
churl
churlish
churn
cinder
Cinderella
clad
clam
clamber
clammy
clamp
clap
clapboard
claptrap
clash
clasp
classroom
clatter
claw
clay
clean
cleanliness
cleanse
cleansing
cleanup
clearinghouse
cleat
cleavage
cleave (split)
cleave (stick to)
cleaver
cleft
clench
Cleveland
clever
clew
cliff
cliffhanger
climb
climber
clinch
clincher
cling
clingy
clip (fasten)
clip-on
clipboard
clockwise
clockwork
clod
clodhopper
clot
cloth
clothe
clothes
clothesline
clothespin
cloud
Cloud Cuckoo Land
cloud nine
cloudburst
cloudy
clout
clove (wedge of garlic)
cloven
clover
clowder
clubhouse
cluck
clue
clueless
cluster
clutch (clench)
clutter
Clydesdale
co-star
coal
coaming
coastline
coattails
coax
cob
cobble (n)
cobble (v)
cobbler
cobblestone
cobweb
cock (bird)
cock (Mech.)
cock (v)
cock-a-doodle-doo
cockerel
cockeyed
cockney
cockpit
cockscomb
cocksucker
cocksure
cocktail
cocky
coconut
cod
codger
codpiece
codswallop
coke
cold
cold blooded
cold feet
cold front
cold turkey
cold war
collard
collarbone
collie
collier
colliery
collywobbles
color blindness
colt
coltish
comb
come
cometh
comeback
comely
comer
comeupance
comeuppance
comingle
commingle
common good
commonwealth
con (study)
congressman
Connor
continental drift
cookout
cool
coolant
cooler
coolness
coolth
coot
cop (v)
copper (v)
cop (n)
cop (mass of thread)
cop out
copout
copperhead
copycat
copyright
copywriter
core
corn (grain)
corn row
cornerstone
cornhole
cornmeal
Cornwall
corny
cot (hut)
cote
cotquean
cough
could
couldn't
countdown
counterclockwise
countryside
courthouse
courtyard
couth
cove
Coventry
cow (n)
cowboy
cowlick
coworker
cowslip
Cox
coxcomb
crab
crabby
crack
crackdown
cracker
cracker-jack
crackhead
crackle
crackpot
cradle
craft
craftsman
crafty
cram
cranberry
crane
crank
crankshaft
craps
crash
crave
cravings
craw
creak
creep
creeper
creepy
cress
crestfallen
crib
cribbage
crick
crimp
cringe
crinkle
Crip
cripple
croak
crock
crockery
croft
crop
cross-eye
cross-fire
cross-stitch
crossbow
crossover
crossroad
crossroads
crossword
crow (n)
crow (v)
crowd
crud
crumb
crumble
crumby
crummy
crumpet
crumple
cruise
crutch
cubbyhole
cucking stool
cud
cuddle
cudgel
cum
Cumberland
cun
cunning
cunt
cupboard
curd
curdle
curl
curly
curse
cuss
cut
cutoff
cutpurse
cutter
cutthroat
cutting edge
cuttlefish

D

D-day
dab
dabble
dad
daddy
daffy
daft
daily
dairy
daisy
dale
Dallas
Dalton
dam
damp
dampen
dander (dandruff)
dandruff
dandy
Dane
Danish
dare
daredevil
dark
Dark Ages
dark horse
darken
darkling
darkness
darling
darn (conceal a hole)
Darwin
Darwinism
dashboard
dat
dateline
daughter
davenport
daw
dawdle
dawg
dawn
day
day care
Day-Glo
daybreak
daydream
daylight
daytime
dead
dead end
dead man's hand
dead reckoning
Dead Sea
deadbeat
deaden
Deadhead
deadline
deadlock
deadly
deadpan
deadweight
deadwood
deaf
deafen
deafening
deal
dealer
dear
dearborn
dearie
dearth
deary
death
death camp
death wish
deathbed
deathly
debug
deed
deem
deemed
deep
deep six
deep-seated
deepen
deeply
deer
defilade
defile
defrost
deft
deftly
delf
delftware
dell
delouse
delve
demean
demeaning
den
dene
Denmark
dent
Denver
depth
derby
derring-do
derth
desktop
devil-may-care
Devon
Devonian
dew
dewlap
dewy
dey
dibble
dibs
dickhead
did
diddle
didn't
didst
die ( < AS *dīegan)
diehard
dig (ME diggen ?< AS dīcian)
digs
dike
dill
dim
dimmer
dimple
dimwit
din
dingle
dingy
dinky
dint
dip
disbelief
disbelieve
disembodied
disgruntle
disgruntled
dishearten
dislike
Disneyland
disown
distaff
ditch
dither
dive
dizzy
do
do-gooder
docket
dodder
dodge
doe
doff
dog (n)
dog (v)
dog days
dog leg
dogfight
dogger
doggerel
doggone
doghouse
doldrums
dole
doleful
dollop
dolt
Domesday book
don
doom
Doomsday
door
dot
dough
doughboy
doughnut
doughty
dove (n)
dove (v)
dow
down (adv)
down (n)
downbeat
downcast
downer
download
downscale
draft
dragnet
dragonfly
drain
drake (male duck)
drat
draught
draw
drawback
drawbridge
drawer
drawers
drawing room
drawn
dray
dread
Dreadnought
dream
dreamt
dreary
drench
drew
dribble
drift
drink
drip
drive
drivel
drizzle
drone
drool
drop
dross
drought
drove (n)
drove (v)
drown
drowsy
drudge
drudgery
Drummond light
drunk
drunkard
druthers
dry
dub
duck (bird)
duck (v)
ducky
dud
dugout
dull
dumb
dumbbell
dumbfound
dumbfounded
dumbledore
dummy
dun (v)
dun (adj)
dung
Durham
dusk
dust
dwarf
dwell
dwindle
dye
dying

E

'em
-ed
-er (agent suffix)
-er (comparative suffix)
e'en
e'er
e.t.a.
ea
each
each other
ealdorman
ear
ear (of corn)
earache
eardrum
earful
earl
earldom
earlobe
early
earmark
earn
earnings
earnest
earnings
earring
earshot
earth
Earth Day
earth-mother
earthen
earthenware
earthlight
earthling
earthly
earthquake
earthwork
earthworm
earthy
earwax
earwig
east
Easter
Easter Island
eastern
Eastlake
easy-going
eat
eatable
eaten
eatery
eats (n)
eave
eaves
eavesdrop
eavesdropper
ebb
eco-friendly
eddy
Edgar
edge (n)
edge (v)
edgeways
edgewise
edging
edgy
Edinburgh
Edith
Edmund
Edward
Edwin
eel
eerie
eff
eft
eftsoons
egad
Egbert
egghead
eh
eight
eighteen
eighth
eighty
eighty-six
either
eke
elbow
eld
elder (berry)
elder
elderly
eldest
eldritch
eleven
elf
Eliot (< Æðelgeat)
elk
ell
Ellis Island
elm
else
elsewhere
embankment
embed
ember
ember days
embitter
embody
embodiment
embroider
emmet
empty
end
endear
endearing
endearment
endlong
Enfield
enfold
England
English
enlighten
enlightenment
enlist
enliven
enough
entrapment
entwine
enwrap
ere
Erin
Erl-king
erne
Ernest
errand
erst
erstwhile
ettin
eve
even
evening
ever
ever-lasting
every
evil
ewe
eye
eyesore
eyetooth
eyewash
eyot

F

-fold
-ful
fain
fair (adj)
fairing
faith healer
fall
fallow (n)
fallow (adj)
fang
far
fare (n)
fare (v)
farewell
farm
farrow
fart
farther
farthing
fast (adj)
fast (v)
fasten
fastness
fat (n)
fat (adj)
father
fathom
fawn (v)
fay "to fit, join, unite"
faze
fear
feather
fed up
feed
feel
feeling
feelings
feet
fell (v)
fell (adj)
felt (n)
fen
fere
fern
Ferris wheel
ferry (n)
ferry (v)
fetch
fetlock
fetter
fettle
few
fey
fickle
fiddle
field
fiend
fifteen
fifth
fifty
fight
figurehead
filch
file ("metal tool")
fill
film
filth
fin
finch
find
finew
finger
fir
fire
first
fish
fist
fit (n)
fit ("sudden attack")
five
fizzle
flab
flabbergasted
flabby
flagstone
flap
flapper
flash
flashback
flasher
flashlight
flashy
flask
flat ("apartment, floor")
flatter
flax
flay
flea
fledge
fledgling
flee
fleece
fleet (n)
fleet ("swift")
fleeting
Fleming
flesh
fleshpot
fleshy
flew
flibbertigibbet
flick (n)
flicker (n)
flicker (v)
flight ("act of flying")
flight ("act of fleeing")
flint
flip (v)
flip (n)
flip-flop
flippant
flipper
flirt
flitch
float
flock
flood
floor
flop
floss
flow
flue
fluke ("flatfish")
flurry
flush (v)
flush (adj)
flutter
fly ("flying insect")
fly ("fare through the air")
fly ("flee")
fly-by-night
flyer
foal
foam
fodder
foe
fold
fold ("pen for animals")
folk
folklore
follow
fond
fondle
food
foot
footage
football
foothill
footing
footloose
footpad
footsie
footstep
for
forbear
forbearance
forbear ("ancestor")
forbid
ford
fordo
fordrive
fore
forebode
foreboding
forechoose
foredoom
forefather
forego
foreground
forehand
forehead
forelead
forelock
foreman
foremost
foreplay
forerunner
foresaid
foresee
foreshadow
foreshorten
forestall
foretell
forethought
foretoken
forever
forewarn
forewit
foreword
forget
forgive
forgo
forlorn
former
forsake
forsooth
forswear
forth
forthfare
forthgoing
fortnight
forty
forward
forwhy
foster
fought
foul
foundling
four
fourth estate
fowl
fox
fraidy-cat
frame
framework
frazzle
freak
free
free verse
freedom
freelance
Freemason
freewheeling
freeze
fremd (also fremmit, frempt) "strange, foreign, alien"
French
fresh
freshman
fret
Friday
friend
friendship
fright
frog
from
frost
frostbitten
frosting
froward
frowzy
frumpy
fuck (informal)
fudge
Fulbright
fulfill
fulfillment
full
fun
funny
furlong
furrow
further
furze
fuzz

G

G-man
G-string
gad
gadfly
gadzooks
gaffer
gainsay
gal
gale
gall ("bile")
gall ("sore spot")
gallows
Gallup poll
gamble
game
gammer
gander
gang
gang-bang
gangster
gannet
gar
garlic
gat
gate
gather
Gatling gun
gavel
gefilte fish
geld
gemstone
ghost
Gibson girl
giddy
gild
gilded
gilt
gimcrack
gimp
gingerbread
gird
girdle
girl
girlfriend
girlie
git
give
glad
glass
Glastonbury
glaze
gleam
glee
gleeman
glide
glimmer
glimpse
glisten
gloaming
global warming
gloom
gloomy
glory hole
glove
glow
glum
gnarled
gnarl
gnarly
gnat
gnaw
go
go south
go west
go-cart
go-go
goad
goal
goat
goatee
goatherd
god
godless
goddess
godhead
Godiva
godsend
gofer
goggle
gold
Goldilocks
golliwog
golly
good
Good Friday
good-bye
goody
goof
goon
goose
gooseberry
GOP
Gordian knot
gore (n)
gore (v)
gorse
gory
gosh
goshawk
gosling
gospel
gossamer
gossip
gotcha
Gotham
gourmet
Graham
grandfather
grandstand
grasp
grass
grave ("ditch, burial plot")
grave ("to dig")
gray
graze ("to eat grass")
graze ("to make contact")
great
greedy
greed
green
greenback
Greenland
greens
Greenwich
greet ("to meet")
greet ("to cry")
gremlin
grey
greyhound
grill "to anger, provoke"
grill "harsh"
grim
grime
grin
grind
grip
gripe
grisly
grist
gristle
grit
grits
groan
groats
groin
groom ("youth")
groom ("bridegroom")
groove
grope
ground
grout
grove
grow
grub
grubstreet
grump
grunge
grungy
grunt
guild
guilt
guilty
Guinea pig
gulch
gum ("membranes of the mouth")
gunwale
gut

H

-hood
ha
hack ("chop")
hack ("hireling")
hacker
hackle
hackney
hackneyed
had
haft
hag
hag-ridden
haggaday
haggle
hail ("frozen rain")
hair
hake
hale ("healthy")
half
half seas over
half-assed
half-life
half-wit
halibut
halidom
hall
hallmark
hallow
Halloween
halmote
halt ("lame")
halter
halve
ham
hammer
Hampshire
hamstring
hand
hand of glory
handbook
handcuff
handfast
handicap
handicraft
handiwork
handkerchief
handle
handmaid
handout
handsome
handwriting
hang
hang-dog
hanging
hangnail
hangover
hansom
hantle
harbor (also harbour)
hard
hardly
hardtack
hardware
hardwood
hare
hark
harlequin
harm
harp
harrow ("rake")
harrow ("to wound")
harrowing
harry
hart
Harvard
harvest
has-been
hasp
hassle
hassock
Hastings
hat
hat trick
hatch ("emerge from an egg")
hatch ("gate")
hate
hath
hatred
have
haven
hawse
hawthorn
hay
Hayward
haywire
haze
hazy
hazel
he
he-he
head
headache
headless
headline
headlong
headway
headwound
heady
heal
health
heap
hear
heard
hearken
heart
hearth
heat
heath
heathen
heather
heave
heaven
heavy
heck
hedge
heed
heel
heel ("of a ship")
heel ("bad person")
heft
heifer
heigh-ho
height
heinie ("buttocks")
heirloom
held
hell
Hell's Angels
hellcat
hellfire
hellhole
helm
help
helpmate
helve
hem
hemlock
hemp
hen
hence
henchman
henge
Henley
her ("object")
her ("possessive")
herd
here
Herefordshire
heriot
herring
hers
Hertfordshire
hew
hey
heyday
hi
hi-fi
hi-jinks
hiccup
hide ("to conceal")
hide ("skin")
hidebound
hie
higgledy-piggledy
high
high-falutin'
high-five
highball
highboy
highbrow
highlight
hight
highway
hijack
hike
hill
hillbilly
hilt
him
hind ("after")
hind ("doe")
hinder ("obstruct")
hinder ("rear")
hindmost
hindrance
hindsight
hinge
hint
hip
hip ("rose hip")
hire
hireling
his
hiss
hissing
hitch
hither
hitherto
hive
hives
ho
hoar
hoard
hoarse
hoary
hob
hobble
hobnail
hobnob
hobo
hock ("leg joint")
hog
hogshead
hogwash
hogweed
hoity-toity
hold (v)
hold ("lower part of a ship")
hole
holiday
holiness
hollow
holly
hollyhock
Hollywood
holster
holt
holy
holystone
home
homeboy
homecoming
homely
homesickness
homestead
homework
hone
honey
honeydew
honeymoon
honeysuckle
hood ("covering")
hood ("neighborhood")
hoodwink
hoof
hook
hooker
hoop
hoot
Hoover
hop
hope
hoping
hopped
hopper
hopscotch
horn
horny
hornet
hornswoggle
horse
horse-chestnut
horsefeathers
horsepower
horseradish
hose
hoss
hot
hot dog
hot pants
hotbed
hothead
hothouse
hound
hourglass
house
housebreak
housekeeper
housing "lodging"
houseleek
hovel
hover
hovercraft
how
howbeit
howdy
however
howl
hub
huckleberry
hue "blee, colour"
hull "seed casing"
hum
humdrum
hummock
Humphrey
hunch
hundred
hung
hung-over
hung-up
hunger
hunt
Huntingdon
hurdle
hurl
hurling
hurly-burly
hurry
hurst
hush
hussy
hutch "storage chest"

I

-in (as in "sit-in")
-ing (gerund ending)
-ing (pres. part. ending)
-ish
I
I've
I.O.U.
ice
iceberg (partial trans. of Dutch ijsberg)
icicle
Icknield Way
icky
idle
if
ilk
impound
in
in-
in-fighting
in-joke
in-law
in like Flynn
inasmuch
inborn
income
indeed
Indian summer
indoor
infare
infield
inflight
infra-red
ingot
ingrown
inhold
inkhorn
inkling
inlaid
inland
inlead
inlet
inmate
inn
innards
inner
inning
input
inroad
inset
inside
insight
insightful
instead
instep
intake
Internet
interplay
into
inward
inwit
Irish
iron
Iron Age
Iron Cross
Iron Curtain
ironclad
Ironside
Irwin
is
island
it
itch
its
itself
itsy-bitsy
ivy

J

jab
jabber
jack-in-the-box
jack-knife
jackanapes
jackdaw
jackpot
jag "sharp edge"
jagged
jar (verb)
jaw
jeer
jerk
jerry-built
jersey
jigsaw
jimson weed
jitter
jitterbug
jitters
job
joe-pye weed
jog
jolt
jowl
jumble
jump
jumper
Jute

K

keen
keep
keepsake
kelp
ken
kenning
kernel
key
keyboard
keynote
keystone
kick
kidney
kill
killdeer
kin
kind (n)
kind (adj)
kindred
kine
king
king's evil
kipper
kirk
kiss
kite
kith
knave
knead
knee
kneel
knew
knife
knight
knit
knock
knoll
knot
know
know-how
knowledge
knowledgeable
knuckle
knurl
kythe

L

-less
-ling
-ly (adj)
-ly (adv)
lack
lackadaisical
lackluster ( also lacklustre)
lad
ladder
lade
laden
lading
ladies
ladle
lady
ladybug
laid
laidly
lain
lair
laird
lake
lamb
lame
lame duck
Lammas
land (n)
land (v)
land "hit home, make contact"
landed "owning land"
landfall
landfill
landform
landing "stow for boats"
landline
landlock
landlocked
landlord
landlubber
landmark
landslide
lane
lang syne
lank
lanky
lap (n)
lap (v)
lap "to fold (over)" (v)
lapdog
lapel
Lapland
lappet
laptop
lapwing
larboard
lark
last (adj./adv.)
last (v.)
last "shoemaker's block"
latch
late
later
latest
lath
lather
latter
latticework
laugh
laughable
laughing-stock
laughter
lave "the rest" (n.)
lave "to pout water on" (v.)
law-abiding
lawn mower
lay
layabout
layaway
layer
layoff
layover
layup
layman
lea
leach
lead (n.)
leaden
lead (v.)
leader
leadership
leaf
leaflet
lean (adj.)
lean (v.)
lean-to
leap
leap year
learn
lease "to gather, collect"
lease "false, deceptive"
leasing
least
leather
leave "permission" (n.)
leave (v.)
lech
LED
lede "people; tenements, possessions"
lede "introductory paragraph"
ledge
ledger
lee
leech "worm"
leech "physician"
leek
leer
leery
leeward
leeway
left (adj.)
left-wing
leftist
leftover
leman
lend
length
lengthen
lengthy
Lent
less
lessen
lest
let "to allow"
letdown
let "to delay"
letch
letterhead
levelheaded
lewd
liar
lich
Lichfield
lick
lid
lie "to recline" (v.)
lier
lie "to speak falsely" (v.)
lie "an untruth" (n.)
lief
liever
life
life-line
lifeblood
lifeguard
lifeless
lifelike
lifelong
lifespan
lifestyle
lifetime
liftoff
light (adj.)
light-fingered
light-headed
light-hearted
lighten
lightly
lights
lightweight
light (n.)
lightbulb
light year
lighten
lightening
lighter
lighthouse
lightning
light (v.)
like (adj.)
likeminded
liken
likeness
likewise
like (v.)
likeable
lilt
lily-livered
lima bean
limb
limber (adj.)
chalky mineral
limelight
limestone
linden tree
limp (v.)
limp (adj.)
linch
linchpin
luscious
lush (adj.)
lust
lustful
lustily
lusty
luv
lye
lying
lynch

M

madder
maiden
make
mallow
malm
manifold
manly
mare
mark
marrow
marsh
mast
match
mate
mattock
maund
May
maybe
maze
me
meal
mean
meanwhile
meat
meet
mellow
mere
merry
mettle
mickle
midday
midnight
milk
milt
minnow
mint
mire
mirth
mistletoe
month
mood
moon
moor
moot
more
morrow
moss
mote
moth
mother
mug
mugwort
must

N

name
narrow
navel
near
nearby
neck
need
neighbour
neither
ness
nestle
nestling
nether
nettle
network
never
new
newcomer
newsreel
newton
nook
north
nose
nostril
nothing
now
nut
nutshell

O

oak
oar
oat
offstand
old
on
onfang
or
ordeal
otter
ought
our
outcome
outgoing
outland
outlandish
oven
over
overboard
overcome
overdo
overflow
overhead
oversee
overset
overshadow
oversit
overstep
overthrow
overwork
owe
owl
own
owndom
ox

P
paddock
pathfinder
peak
pick
pig
pinfold
pillow
pitfall
plight
puff

Q

qualm
quake
queem
queen
quell
quench
quick
quirn
quoth

R

rain
rainbow
raindrop
rainworm
rake
rame
rathe
raw 
raven
read 
reap
reard "voice, sound"
reave
reckless
red
redd
rede
reek
reeve
rend
rethe
rich
richdom
riche "kingdom, realm"
right
righteousness
ring
ripe
rivel
road
roam
rogh 
roof
room
rope
rother
rough
round "to whisper"
row
rue
ruly
runecraft
rush
rust
rye

S

sad
saddle
sail
sake
sallow
salve
same
sand
sap
say
scathe
scab
scop
seafowl
seethe
seldom
shadow
shake
shale
shall
shame
shand
shape
shard
share
shareware
shear
sheepfold
sheriff
shield
ship
shipshape
shit (Informal)
shop
sprawl
stalwart or alternatively stalworth
steven "voice"
stevvon
stone, from OE stan
stound "hour"
stretch
strong
swart
swath

T

tail
talk
tallow
tame
tarry
teasel
teeth
tell
ten
tenfold
terve
thane
thank
thankfulness
tharm
thatch
thaw
the
theft
there
thereafter
therewith
thicket
thieve
thigh
thimble
thorn
thorp
thou
thrash
thread
threap
three
threefold
threshold
thrice
throng
throw
thunder
thus
thy
tide
time
tinder
tinker
today
together
token
town, from OE tun.
tree, from OE trēow.
troth
tumble
turd (informal)
twelve
tusk
twilight
two

U

udder
um-
umbe
umbe-
umbecast
umbedraw
umbego
umbeset
umbethink
umbraid
umgang
umstroke
umwhile
unbind
unbury
unclean
uncouth
undeadliness
undeadly
under
underbear
undercome
undergo
underlay
underling
underneath
underseek
underset
understand
undertake
underwrite
undo
uneath
uneven
unfair
unfold
unfriendly
ungird
unholy
unknit
unlike
unlock
unseen
untime
untold
unweather
up
upbraid
upheave
upload
upon
upright
uprise
upward
utmost

V
vane
vat
vixen

W

wacken
wade
wag
wain
wake
wald
walk
wallow
walnut
wan
wander
wane
wang "cheek, jaw"
wangtooth "molar"
want
wark
warlock
warm
warn
warry
wart
watch
water
waterfall
wathe
wax
waybread
wayfare
we
weasel
weather
web
wedge
wedlock
weed
weighty
weird
welcome
weld
well (noun)
welkin
welter
were "man"
westy
wem
wench
wend
whale
whan
what
wheel
whelp
when
where
white
who
why
wield
wife
wile
will
winter
wis (also wiss) "certain, sure"
wish
wisly
wit
woman
wone
wonky
wood
woodcock
word
word-hoard
work
workword
world
wrack
wreak
wrength
wrist
write
wrong
wroth
wuss "juice"
withbear
withdraw
withgo
withstand "with, back, against, see withhold"
withsay
withstay
withtake
withhold

X
Xhenl
xhone 
xex

Y

yammer
yard
yare
yark
yarn
yarrow
yawn
year
yearday
yearn
yearly
yeast
yeke
yell
yellow
yellowhammer
yelp
yeoman
yesterday
yew
yex
yield
yonder
you
young
youth
Yule
Yuletide

Z
zax

Notes

References
Online Etymology Dictionary. Dictionary.com.

See also
Lists of English loanwords by country or language of origin
List of Germanic and Latinate equivalents in English
Linguistic purism in English

Anglo-Saxon